Jackrin Kungwankiatichai (born 29 March 2001); also known by his nickname Jackie, is a Thai singer, actor, brand endorser and model. He was a member of the Thai boy group Nine by Nine, and is currently a member of TRINITY. He is the grand champion of the Thai singing competition The Mask Thai Literature.

Early life and education 

Jackrin was born on 29 March 2001. His father is Kamol Kungwankiatichai, and he has a younger sister named Chawunluk Kungwankiatichai, who is currently a trainee under 4NOLOGUE. He attended school at Bangkok Christian College and is currently studying Acting and Film Directing at the College of Social Communication Innovation, Srinakharinwirot University.

Career

Jackrin began his music career in 2015 with the band Yellow Mustard. One of the band members is then-future Nine by Nine co-member Paris Intarakomalyasut. In 2017, Paris referred Jackrin to 4nologue CEO Anuwat Wichiennarat to audition for the label.

Jackrin signed with the label in 2018. From then to 2019, he became a member of the idol group Nine by Nine, a special one-year project by 4nologue in association with Nadao Bangkok. The group overall has released five songs and one mini-album, and embarked on a series of concert tours across Thailand.

As part of the project, Jackrin starred in two television series. His acting debut came with the 2018 TV series In Family We Trust where he received positive feedback for his performance as Thanat Suriyapairoj (Toei) and earned him acting nominations. He also performed a main role in the 2019 TV series Great Men Academy as Menn.

After the project ended in March 2019, 4nologue announced that it has formed a new boy group among the members of Nine by Nine. Jackrin, along with Teeradon Supapunpinyo, Sivakorn Adulsuttikul, and Lapat Ngamchaweng, debuted as TRINITY in September 2019. Jackrin is the main vocals of the group.

Jackrin was then paired with Sivakorn to appear as a duo in the 2019 TV singing competition show The Mask Thai Literature as Holvichai-Kavee where they received overall positive acclaim from the judges and its viewers. They were hailed as the season's champions by garnering the highest votes from the audience and viewers' text votes during the final round. They became the youngest and first and only duo to win in the show.

As a brand endorser, he collaborated with Thai rapper Milli for the song "Say It", as part of a promotion for an ice cream brand. Together with TRINITY co-member Sivakorn, they became the brand ambassador for the cosmetics brand retailer Kiehl's Thailand. As part of the promotional campaign, the duo has released "My Calendula" as a special single. 

In 2022, he starred as the heir of a wealthy family on the Thai TV series You Are My Heartbeat. He also sang one of the series' original soundtrack.

Jackrin landed his first voice acting role in August 2022 for the Thai-dubbed version of One Piece Film: Red. He described the project as a "dream come true" as a childhood fan of its manga and anime versions.

Filmography

Films

Television series

Web series

Discography

Awards and nominations

References

External links

2001 births
Living people
Jackrin Kungwankiatichai
Jackrin Kungwankiatichai
Jackrin Kungwankiatichai
Jackrin Kungwankiatichai
Jackrin Kungwankiatichai
Jackrin Kungwankiatichai
Jackrin Kungwankiatichai